The Last Don II is the sixth studio album by Don Omar, released on June 16, 2015, through Pina Records and Machete Music. It is the sequel of Don Omar's first album, The Last Don, released in 2003, and includes twelve songs and includes the participation of reggaeton stars. Wisin & Yandel, Daddy Yankee, Tego Calderón, Plan B, and Natti Natasha. Contrary of Don Omar's latest album, The Last Don II focuses on reggaeton, with exceptions including two hip hop tracks and one latin pop track. It features four singles: "Soledad", "Guaya Guaya", "Perdido En Tus Ojos" and "Te Recordaré Bailando". And songs ''Callejero", "En Lo Oscuro", Olvidar Que Somos Amigos", Dobla Rodilla", "Tirate Al Medio", " Bailando Bajo El Sol", "Sandunga". The songs themes includes dance, sex, love and human self-reflection. It was nominated for a Latin Grammy Award for Best Urban Music Album in the ceremony's 16th edition in 2015.

Reception 
The artist was top latin artists in 2015, the album won award favorite latin & world albums for AllMusic in 2015,  the album It was nominated for a Billboard Latin Rhythm Album of the Year and Latin Rhythm Albums Artist of the Year in 2016.

The album debuted at the top of the Billboard Top Latin Albums, selling 7,000 units on the first week.

Background 

Don Omar's most recent album was the Latin Grammy winner compilation Meet The Orphans 2: New Generation, released in 2012, but his most recent studio album was Meet The Orphans, released in 2010. The Last Don 2 is the sequel of Don Omar's first studio album, The Last Don, released in 2003. In 2014 were released two singles, «Pura Vida» and «Nada Cambiará» featuring Xavi The Destroyer, which were originally part of the track list, but after some time the songs were suppressed of it. The song «Finge Que Me Amas» featuring Tony Dize was released in Tony's album, La Melodía De La Calle: 3rd Season, instead of this one. Between 2014 and 2015 were released the tracks previews, and in 2015 was confirmed the album's track list, suppressing the intro «Il Capo», which uses the chorus of Ray Charles' single «Hit The Road Jack» and was also part of the original production.

Production 

The Last Don II was recorded between 2013 and 2015, with "Yo Soy De Aquí" as the first promotional song, which was originally recorded for Don Omar's concert Hecho En Puerto Rico in the José Miguel Agrelot Coliseum. After releasing pop hits including "Danza Kuduro", "Taboo", "Zumba", "Hasta Que Salga El Sol" and "Pura Vida", Don Omar decided to release a 100% reggaeton album for his fans, remembering the music that made him famous. There were 24 songs recorded for this album, including one track featuring Jennifer Lopez and other one with Flo Rida, but Don Omar decided not to include those songs and releasing a 12-songs-long production. It includes also the first collaboration between Wisin & Yandel since their hiatus in 2013.

In an interview with Billboard magazine in 2015, Landrón said that he is planning to release a deluxe edition including the rest of the tracks that weren't released on the original one. He mentioned that there's going to be a tour with Daddy Yankee, and also that he wants to make music videos with him and Wisin & Yandel. In 2014, Don Omar was arrested because of domestic violence, implying that he threatened his girlfriend Rebecca Lopez. He was bailed out but with an electronic shackle, and he finished the album recording at home.

Finally, the album was released worldwide on June 16, 2015, through Pina Records and Machete Music, and reached the top position in the latin ranking of iTunes, as well as the top position on Billboard's Top Latin Albums charts. Don Omar stated that it is a new stage in his musical career and his album success was unexpected for him. As of February 2016 there were no music videos for any of the album's tracks due to problems between Don Omar and his label, Universal Music Latino, whose 10-year-long contract didn't benefit him, who said that he will begin the videos' shooting once his contract ends.

Singles 

"Guaya Guaya" is the album's first single, released on October 6, 2014. It was written by Don Omar and Jumbo, and was produced by Chris Jeday, Gaby Music, Jumbo and Luny Tunes. It reached the #8 position on Billboard's Latin Digital Songs charts. The single was certified gold by the PROMUSICAE.
"Soledad" is the second single, released on October 21, 2014. It was written by Don Omar, Raphy Pina, Christopher Montalvo, and Wilmer and Xavier Semper, and was produced by Gaby Music, Mambo Kingz and Bryan. It reached the top position on Billboard's Latin Airplay charts. A salsa version was released in February 2015. The single was nominated for a Lo Nuestro Award for Urban Song of the Year in 2016, and was certified platinum by the PROMUSICAE.
"Perdido En Tus Ojos" is the third single, released on April 24, 2015. It features latin pop artist Natti Natasha, who worked with Don Omar twice before, in the Latin Grammy winner "Dutty Love" and "Tus Movimientos", both released in 2012. The song was written by Don Omar, Natti Natasha, Chris Jeday and Gaby Music. It reached the #3 position on Billboard's Latin Digital Songs charts. The single was certified platinum by the PROMUSICAE.

"Te Recordaré Bailando" is the fourth single, released on June 6, 2015, ten days before the album's release. It was written by Don Omar, Jumbo and Christopher Montalvo, and was produced by Gaby Music and Jumbo. Although the single didn't manage to chart in the US, it reached the 36th position in the Spanish charts.

Promotional songs
"Yo Soy De Aquí" is the album's only promotional song, recorded at Pina Records, and released on April 30, 2013. It features Yandel, Arcángel and Daddy Yankee, being written by all them, Eliel and Raphy Pina, and was produced by Eliel. Tego Calderón was originally featured, but because of problems between him and Daddy Yankee (consequence of Yankee's rivalry with Eddie Dee), he decided not to work in the song. It was recorded because of Don Omar's concert Hecho En Puerto Rico in the José Miguel Agrelot Coliseum in May 2013.

Other charted songs
"En Lo Oscuro" was released alongside the album, and features Wisin & Yandel, being the fifth collaboration between the three artists. It was written by Don Omar, Wisin & Yandel, Chris Jeday and Gaby Music. It reached the #49 position on Billboard's Latin Digital Songs charts. Don Omar talked about filming the song's music video.
"Tírate Al Medio" was released alongside the album, and features Daddy Yankee, being the seventh time that they work together. It was written by Don Omar, Daddy Yankee, Chris Jeday and Gaby Music. It reached the #32 position on Billboard's Latin Digital Songs charts. Don Omar talked about filming the song's music video.

Track listing 

The album consists in twelve tracks, focusing on reggaeton music, also with two hip hop tracks and a Latin pop track. There are two songs that are mixes between genres: "Soledad" mixes reggaeton and bachata, including guitar and accordion melodies; and "Bailando Bajo El Sol", which musically mixes smooth reggaeton and reggae. Don Omar co-wrote all tracks, and almost all of them has additional writing by a producer. The only track that does not feature the producer's lyrics is "Dobla Rodilla", which was written by Don Omar and Wisin. Chris Jeday and Gaby Music produced almost the entire album, with additional work by Jumbo, Mambo Kingz, Bryan, Luny Tunes, Duran and Tainy. Eliel, who was part of Don Omar's production team in his first two studio albums, produced only one track, "Yo Soy De Aquí", released in April 2013 to promote his concert in the José Miguel Agrelot Coliseum the following month.

Credits and personnel 

Most credits adapted from AllMusic.

William Landrón: Primary Artist – Vocals – Lyrics – Executive Producer
Rafael Pina: Lyrics – Engineer – Mixing
Nino Segarra: Engineer – Mixing
David Duran: Engineer – Mixing
Juan Rivera: Engineer – Mixing
Mike Fuller: Mastering
Carlos Ortíz: Producer – Lyrics
Luis Ortíz: Producer
Victor Viera: Producer – Lyrics
Marco Masis: Producer
Xavier Semper & Wilmer Semper (Mambo Kingz): Producers – Lyrics
Bryan: Producer
Francisco Saldaña & Victor Cabrera (Luny Tunes): Producers

Christopher Montalvo: Producer – Lyrics
Eliel Lind: Producer – Lyrics
Milton Restituyo: Producer
Ana Alvarado: Production Coordination
Natalia Gutiérrez: Featured Artist – Vocals – Lyrics
Tegui Calderón: Featured Artist – Vocals – Lyrics
Juan Morera: Featured Artist – Vocals – Lyrics
Llandel Veguilla: Featured Artist – Vocals – Lyrics
Orlando Valle: Featured Artist – Vocals – Lyrics
Edwin Vázquez: Featured Artist – Vocals
Ramón Ayala: Featured Artist – Vocals – Lyrics
Austin Santos: Featured Artist – Vocals – Lyrics

Charts

Weekly charts

Year-end charts

Charts songs

Accolades

!align="center"|Ref.
|-
|align="center" rowspan="3"|2015
|Don Omar
|Latin American Music Awards – Favorite Urban Male Artist
|
|align="center"|
|-
|rowspan="3"|The Last Don 2
|Latin Grammy Awards – Best Urban Music Album
|
|align="center"|
|-
|Billboard – Best Latin Albums of 2015
|
|align="center"|
|-
|align="center" rowspan="2"|2016
|Lo Nuestro Awards – Urban Album of the Year
|
|align="center" rowspan="2"|
|-
|«Soledad»
|Lo Nuestro Awards – Urban Song of the Year
|
|}

References 

Don Omar albums
2015 albums
Pina Records albums
Machete Music albums